Söyüdlü or Sëyudlyu or Seyudlu or Segyutlyu or Sogyutlyu or Seyudlyu or Sogyultlu may refer to:
Sarnaghbyur, Armenia
Söyüdlü, Gadabay, Azerbaijan
Söyüdlü, Jalilabad, Azerbaijan
Söyüdlü, Jabrayil, Azerbaijan
Bala Söyüdlü, Azerbaijan
Böyük Söyüdlü, Azerbaijan